Charles McGavin (January 10, 1874 – December 17, 1940) was a U.S. Representative from Illinois.

Born in Riverton, Illinois, McGavin attended the common schools in Springfield and the high school in Mount Olive, Illinois. He studied law. He was admitted to the bar in 1897 and practiced two years in Springfield. He moved to Chicago in 1899 and resumed the practice of law. He served as assistant city attorney of Chicago in 1903 and 1904.

McGavin was elected as a Republican to the Fifty-ninth and Sixtieth Congresses (March 4, 1905 – March 3, 1909). He was not a candidate for renomination in 1908. He resumed the practice of law in Chicago. He moved to Los Angeles in 1912 and practiced law until 1915, when he returned to Chicago. He served as delegate to the Republican National Convention in 1920.

McGavin died in Chicago, Illinois, December 17, 1940. He was interred in Mount Auburn Cemetery, Berwyn, Illinois.

References

External links

1874 births
1940 deaths
Politicians from Chicago
Republican Party members of the United States House of Representatives from Illinois
People from Riverton, Illinois